Netball at the 1966 South Pacific Games in Nouméa New Caledonia was held from 8–18 December 1966.

This was the second competition at the South Pacific Games for netball. The winner of the event was the Cook Islands over Fiji. Papua New Guinea took home the bronze.

Placings

See also
 Netball at the Pacific Games

References

External links
 Anne Clark profile, netball umpire at the 1966 South Pacific Games.

1966 Pacific Games
Netball at the Pacific Games
1966 in netball